Dong Zhen (born 2 February 1977) is a retired Chinese artistic gymnast. He competed at the 1999 World Artistic Gymnastics Championships in his hometown of Tianjin and won gold, becoming world champion in the still rings event. He was also a part of the Chinese team which won the team competition at that same World Championships.

References 

1977 births
Living people
Chinese male artistic gymnasts
Gymnasts from Tianjin
World champion gymnasts
Medalists at the World Artistic Gymnastics Championships
20th-century Chinese people